Rice tungro spherical virus (RTSV) is a plant pathogenic virus of the family Sequiviridae. RTSV causes mild symptoms by itself, but in the presence of Rice tungro bacilliform virus, symptoms are intensified.

External links
 Family Groups - The Baltimore Method

References

Secoviridae
Viral plant pathogens and diseases